The 1938 Pacific Tigers football team represented the College of the Pacific—now known as the University of the Pacific—in Stockton, California as a member of the Far Western Conference (FWC) during the 1938 college football season. Led by sixth-year head coach Amos Alonzo Stagg, Pacific compiled an overall record of 7–3 with a mark of 4–0 in conference play, winning the FWC title. The team outscored its opponents 203 to 103 for the season. The Tigers played home games at Baxter Stadium in Stockton.

Schedule

Team players in the NFL
No College of the Pacific players were selected in the 1939 NFL Draft.

The following finished their Pacific career in 1938, were not drafted, but played in the NFL.

Notes

References

Pacific
Pacific Tigers football seasons
Northern California Athletic Conference football champion seasons
Pacific Tigers football